Ashok Kumar Patel  is an Indian politician. He was a Member of Parliament, representing Fatehpur, Uttar Pradesh in the Lok Sabha, the lower house of India's Parliament as a member of the Bharatiya Janata Party.

References

External links
Official biographical sketch in Parliament of India website

Lok Sabha members from Uttar Pradesh
Bharatiya Janata Party politicians from Uttar Pradesh
1954 births
Living people